The Wanli Emperor (4 September 1563 – 18 August 1620), personal name Zhu Yijun, was the 14th Emperor of the Ming dynasty, reigned from 1572 to 1620. "Wanli", the era name of his reign, literally means "ten thousand calendars". He was the third son of the Longqing Emperor. His reign of 48 years (1572–1620) was the longest among all the Ming dynasty emperors and it witnessed several successes in his early and middle reign, followed by the decline of the dynasty as the emperor withdrew from his active role in government around 1600.

Early reign (1572–1582)
Zhu Yijun ascended the throne at the age of eight and adopted the regnal name "Wanli", thus he is historically known as the Wanli Emperor. For the first ten years of his reign, he was aided by  a notable statesman, Zhang Juzheng, who governed the country as Wanli's regent. During this period, the Wanli Emperor deeply respected Zhang as a mentor and a valued minister. Archery competitions, equestrianism and calligraphy were some of the pastimes of Wanli. Shortly after Wanli's ascension, a new star appeared in the sky, and Zhang warned him to consider his misbehaviour, as was tradition with the appearance of new stars in the sky, which was considered to be a bad omen. It is generally agreed that this 'new star' was SN 1572, a supernova observed independently by many individuals across the globe.

As Zhang Juzheng was appointed Senior Grand Secretary (Shǒufǔ) in 1572, he launched a reform by the name of "abiding by ancestors' rules". He started from rectifying administration with a series of measures such as reducing redundant personnel and enhancing assessment of officials' performance. This improved officials' quality and efficiency of administration, and based on such facts he launched relevant reforms in the fields of land, finance, and military affairs. In essence, Zhang Juzheng's reform was a rectification of social maladies without offending the established political and fiscal system of the Ming dynasty. Although it did not eradicate political corruption and land annexation, it positively relieved social contradictions. More over, Zhang efficiently protected the dynasty from Japan, Jurchens and Mongols so he could save national defense expenditure. By the 1580s, Zhang stored an astronomical amount of silver, worth 10 years of the state's total tax revenue. The first ten years of Wanli's regime led to a renaissance, economically, culturally and militarily, an era known in historiography as the Wanli Restoration (萬曆中興).

During the first ten years of the Wanli era, the Ming dynasty's economy and military power prospered in a way not seen since the Yongle Emperor and the Reign of Ren and Xuan from 1402 to 1435. After Zhang's death, the Wanli Emperor felt free to act independently, and reversed many of Zhang's administrative improvements. In 1584, the Wanli Emperor issued an edict confiscating all of Zhang's personal wealth and purging his family members. Especially after 1586 when he had conflicts with ministers about his heir, Wanli decided to not hold the council for 20 years. The Ming dynasty's decline began in the interim.

Middle reign (1582–1600)

After Zhang Juzheng's death, the Wanli Emperor decided to take complete personal control of the government. During this early part of his reign, he showed himself to be a competent and diligent emperor. Overall, the economy continued to prosper and the empire remained powerful. Unlike the last 20 years of his reign, the Wanli Emperor at this time would attend court and discuss affairs of state.

The first 18 years of the Wanli era would be dominated by three military campaigns:
 Ningxia campaign: In the northern frontier regions, a Ming general rebelled and allied with the Mongols to attack the Ming Empire. The Wanli Emperor sent his troops to deal with the situation, resulting in overall success.
 Korean campaign: Toyotomi Hideyoshi of Japan sent 200,000 soldiers in his first expedition to invade Korea. The Wanli Emperor made three strategic moves. First, he sent a 3,000-strong army to support the Koreans. Second, if Koreans entered Ming territory, he gave them sanctuary. Third, he instructed the Liaodong area to prepare for possible invasion. The first two battles fought with the Japanese were defeats since Ming troops were outnumbered and ill-prepared to fight the 200,000-strong Japanese army. The emperor then sent a bigger army of 80,000 men, with more success. This resulted in negotiations that favored the Ming. Two years later, in 1596, Japan once again invaded. However, that same year Toyotomi died and the remaining Japanese leadership lost their will to fight. Combined with the naval victories of Guangdong commander Chen Lin and Korean admiral Yi Sun-sin and the bogging down of Japanese forces in the Korean mainland, the demoralised Japanese army withdrew, with peace negotiations following.
 Bozhou campaign: Around the same time as the Korean campaign, a rebellion was brewing in the Chiefdom of Bozhou in southwestern China, led by Yang Yinglong. At first, the Wanli Emperor sent only 3,000 troops under the command of Yang Guozhu to fight the rebellion. However, this army was annihilated and Yang was killed. After the Korean campaign ended, the Wanli Emperor turned his attention to Yang Yinglong, sending Li Huolong and Guo Zhizhang to lead the offensive. In the end, the Ming forces defeated Yang, who committed suicide, and captured Yang's family, who were transported to the capital to be executed, thus quelling the rebellion.

After the last of these three wars were concluded, the Wanli Emperor withdrew from active participation in court, a practice which he continued throughout the rest of his reign.

Late reign (1600–1620)

During the later years of the Wanli Emperor's reign, he became thoroughly alienated from his imperial role and, in effect, went on strike. He refused to attend morning meetings, see his ministers or act upon memoranda. He also refused to make necessary personnel appointments, and as a result the whole top echelon of the Ming administration became understaffed. He did, however, pay close attention to the construction of his own tomb, a magnificent structure that took decades to complete.

There are several reasons why the Wanli Emperor deliberately neglected his duties as emperor. One was that he became disenchanted with the moralistic attacks and counterattacks of officials, rooted in an abstract Confucian orthodoxy. A more important reason, though, was a dispute about the imperial succession. The emperor's favorite consort was Noble Consort Zheng, and throughout the 1580s and 1590s, the emperor very much wanted to promote his son by her (Zhu Changxun) as crown prince, even though he was only the emperor's third son and not favored for the succession. Many of his powerful ministers were opposed, and this led to a clash between sovereign and ministers that lasted more than 15 years. In October 1601, the Wanli Emperor finally gave in and promoted Zhu Changluo – the future Taichang Emperor – as crown prince. Although the ministers seem to have triumphed, the Wanli Emperor adopted a policy of passive resistance, refusing to play his part in allowing the government to function adequately, leading to serious problems both within China itself and on the borders. Additionally, the emperor continued to express his objection to the choice of Zhu Changluo as heir apparent, even delaying the burial of Crown Princess Guo by two years, before allowing her to be buried appropriately for the wife of the crown prince.

The area known as Manchuria in northeastern China was gradually conquered by the Jurchen chieftain Nurhaci. Nurhaci would go on to create the Later Jin (the precursor of the Qing dynasty), which would now become an immediate threat to the Ming dynasty. By this time, after 20 years of imperial dysfunction, the Ming army was in decline. The Jurchens were fewer in number, but they were able to upset the Ming. For instance, in the Battle of Sarhū in 1619, the Ming government sent out an army of 200,000 against the Later Jin army of 60,000, with Nurhaci controlling six banners and 45,000 troops as the central attack, while Daišan and Hong Taiji each controlled 7,500 troops and one banner and attacked from the sides. After five days of battle, the Ming army suffered casualties of over 100,000, with 70% of their food supply stolen.

When the Oirats transmitted some descriptions of China to the Russians in 1614, the name "Taibykankan" was used to refer to the Wanli Emperor by the Oirats.

In 1615, the Ming imperial court was hit by yet another scandal. A man named Zhang Chai (張差), armed with only a wooden staff, managed to chase away the eunuchs guarding the gates and broke into Ciqing Palace (慈慶宮), then the crown prince's living quarters. Zhang Chai was eventually subdued and thrown into prison. Initial investigation found him to be a lunatic, but upon further investigation by a magistrate named Wang Zhicai (王之寀), Zhang Chai confessed to being party to a plot instigated by two eunuchs working under Noble Consort Zheng. According to Zhang Chai's confession, the two had promised him rewards for assaulting the Crown Prince, thus implicating the Emperor's favorite concubine in an assassination plot. Presented with the incriminating evidence and the gravity of the accusations, the Wanli Emperor, in an attempt to spare Noble Consort Zheng, personally presided over the case. He laid the full blame on the two implicated eunuchs who were executed along with the would-be assassin. Although the case was quickly hushed up, it did not quash public discussion and eventually became known as the "Case of the Wooden Staff Assault" (梃擊案), one of three notorious 'mysteries' of the late Ming dynasty.

Legacy and death

Some scholars believe that the Wanli Emperor's reign was a significant factor contributing to the decline of the Ming dynasty. He refused to play the emperor's role in government, and delegated many responsibilities to eunuchs, who made up their own faction. The official administration was so dissatisfied that a group of scholars and political activists loyal to the thoughts of Zhu Xi and against those of Wang Yangming created the Donglin movement, a political group who believed in upright morals and tried to influence the government according to strict Neo-Confucian principles.

His reign also experienced heavy fiscal and military pressures, especially during the final years of the Wanli era when the Jurchens began to conduct raids on the northern border of the Ming Empire. Their depredations ultimately led to the fall of the Ming dynasty in 1644. The fall of the Ming dynasty was not a result of the last Ming emperor's Chongzhen Emperor's rule, but instead due to the lingering consequences of the Wanli Emperor's gross neglect of his duties as emperor.

The Wanli Emperor died in 1620 and was buried in the Dingling Mausoleum among the Ming tombs on the outskirts of Beijing. His tomb is one of the biggest in the vicinity and one of only two that are open to the public. The tomb was excavated in 1956, and remains the only imperial tomb that had been excavated since the founding of the People's Republic of China in 1949. In 1966, during the Cultural Revolution, Red Guards stormed the Dingling Mausoleum, and dragged the remains of the Wanli Emperor and his two empresses to the front of the tomb, where they were posthumously denounced and burned after photographs were taken of their skulls. Thousands of other artifacts were also destroyed.

In 1997, China's Ministry of Public Security published a book on the history of drug abuse. It alleged that the Wanli Emperor's remains had been examined in 1958 and found to contain morphine residues at levels which indicate that he had been a heavy and habitual user of opium.

In popular culture
Portrayed by Jang Tae-sung in the 2015 South Korean television series The Jingbirok: A Memoir of Imjin War.

Family

Consorts and Issue:
 Empress Xiaoduanxian, of the Wang clan (7 November 1564 – 7 May 1620), personal name XijieTitles: Empress (皇后)
 Princess Rongchang (1582–1647), personal name Xuanying, first daughter
 Married Yang Chunyuan (1582–1616) in 1597, and had issue (five sons)
 Empress Dowager Xiaojing, of the Wang clan (27 February 1565 – 18 October 1611)Titles: Consort Gong (恭妃) → Noble Consort Gong (恭貴妃) → Imperial Noble Consort Cisheng (慈生皇貴妃)
 Zhu Changluo, the Taichang Emperor (28 August 1582 – 26 September 1620), first son
 Princess Yunmeng (1584–1587), personal name Xuanyuan, fourth daughter
 Grand Empress Dowager Xiaoning, of the Zheng clan (1565–1630)Titles: Imperial Concubine Shu (淑嬪) → Consort De (德妃) → Noble Consort (貴妃)
 Princess Yunhe (1584–1590), personal name Xuanshu, second daughter
 Zhu Changxu, Prince Ai of Bin (19 January 1585), second son
 Zhu Changxun, Prince Zhong of Fu (22 February 1586 – 2 March 1641), third son
 Zhu Changzhi, Prince Hai of Yuan (10 October 1587 – 5 September 1588), fourth son
 Princess Lingqiu (1588–1589), personal name Xuanyao, sixth daughter
 Princess Shouning (1592–1634), personal name Xuanwei, seventh daughter
 Married Ran Xingrang (d. 1644) in 1609, and had issue (one son)
 Grand Empress Dowager Xiaojing, of the Li clan (d. 1597)Titles: Consort (妃)
 Zhu Changrun, Prince of Hui (7 December 1594 – 29 June 1646), sixth son
 Zhu Changying, Prince Duan of Gui (25 April 1597 – 21 December 1645), seventh son
 Consort Xuanyizhao, of the Li clan (1557–1642)
 Consort Ronghuiyi, of the Yang clan (d. 1581)
 Consort Wenjingshun, of the Chang clan (1568–1594)
 Consort Duanjingrong, of the Wang clan (d. 1591)
 Princess Jingle (8 July 1584 – 12 November 1585), personal name Xuangui, third daughter
 Consort Zhuangjingde, of the Xu clan (d. 1602)
 Consort Duan, of the Zhou clan
 Zhu Changhao, Prince of Rui (27 September 1591 – 24 July 1644), fifth son
 Consort Qinghuishun, of the Li clan (d. 1623)
 Zhu Changpu, Prince Si of Yong (1604–1606), eighth son
 Princess Tiantai (1605–1606), personal name Xuanmei, tenth daughter
 Consort Xi, of the Wang clan (d. 1589)
 Concubine De, of the Li clan (1567–1628)
 Princess Xianju (1584–1585), personal name Xuanji, fifth daughter
 Princess Taishun (d. 1593), personal name Xuanji, eighth daughter
 Princess Xiangshan (1598–1599), personal name Xuandeng, ninth daughter
 Concubine Shen, of the Wei clan (1567–1606)
 Concubine Jing, of the Shao clan (d. 1606)
 Concubine Shun, of the Zhang clan (d. 1589)
 Concubine He, of the Liang clan (1562–1643)
 Concubine Dao, of the Geng clan (1568–1589)
 Shiwei, of the Hu clan
 Noble Lady, of the Guo clan

Ancestry

See also 
 Chinese emperors family tree (late)

Notes

References

Citations

Sources 

 Huang Ray, 1587, a Year of No Significance: The Ming Dynasty in Decline. New Haven: Yale University Press, 1981. 
 Huiping Pang, "The Confiscating Henchmen: The Masquerade of Ming Embroidered-Uniform Guard Liu Shouyou (ca. 1540-1604)," Ming Studies 72 (2015): 24-45. 

1563 births
1620 deaths
Ming dynasty emperors
16th-century Chinese monarchs
17th-century Chinese monarchs
Child monarchs from Asia
Posthumous executions
Victims of the Cultural Revolution
People from Beijing